Widuch  is a village in the administrative district of Gmina Żarnów, within Opoczno County, Łódź Voivodeship, in central Poland.

It is also a surname.

References

Widuch